Rastede  (Low German: Raastäe/Raas) is a municipality in the Ammerland district, in Lower Saxony, Germany. It is situated approximately 12 km north of Oldenburg. It is the site of the Schloss Rastede.

The Rastede railway station is located at the Oldenburg–Wilhelmshaven railway.

Sons and daughters 
 Hermann Schussler (1842-1919), German water-systems engineer and architect of dams 
 Augustus, Grand Duke of Oldenburg (1783-1853), Grand Duke of Oldenburg
 Christian, Duke of Oldenburg (born 1955), Duke of Oldenburg
 Lenn Kuck (born 2001)

References

Ammerland